Investigation Discovery is an Indian television channel dedicated to true crime documentaries owned by Warner Bros. Discovery International, broadcasting in English, Hindi, Tamil, and Telugu. The channel was launched by Warner Bros. Discovery Asia-Pacific on 12 February 2018 which aired programming from its American counterpart and Scripps.

The channel was rebranded as Discovery Jeet in 2018, and later was rebranded as Jeet Prime. However due to poor ratings, the channel switched back as Investigation Discovery in 2020.

History 

Investigation Discovery was launched in 2014 by Discovery Communications India as a Hindi-language entertainment channel. Later, on 1 February 2018, the channel rebranded as Discovery Jeet.

The company also shifted their headquarters from Delhi to Mumbai which is more suited for building a national general entertainment channel. It aims to create 1000 hours of original content a year. The shows will also be available digitally via Netflix. The channel had a reach of 140 million on the day of launch.

Discovery announced plans to revamp the channel with dubbed content from Scripps after low ratings.

However, things did not work out as planned and on 13 January 2020, the channel was rebranded again to Investigation Discovery.

Former shows

Original programming 
21 Sarfarosh - Saragarhi 1897
Anjaan: Special Crimes Unit
Comedy High School
Darr Ke Uss Paar
Gabru: Hip Hop Ke Shehzaade
Khan No.1
Man vs Wild with Sunny Leone
Mere Papa Hero Hiralal 
Shaadi Jasoos
Swami Ramdev - Ek Sangharsh

Dubbed shows 
 A Crime to Remember
 Cry Wolfe
 Deadly Sins
 Evil Kin
 Murder Among Friends
 Unraveled
 The Perfect Murder
 Tabloid
 Web of Lies
 Dangal Kitchen Ka
 Little Stars
 Kya Swad Hai!
 90 Din Ka Pyaar: Hoga Inkaar Ya Ikraar
 Deadly Women
 The Great Indian Global Kitchen
 Extreme Adventures
 Cupcake Wars
 Restaurant Jasoos

External links 
 Official Facebook page

References 

Television stations in Mumbai
Hindi-language television stations
Hindi-language television channels in India
Television channels and stations established in 2014
Television channels and stations established in 2018
Television channels and stations disestablished in 2020
India
Warner Bros. Discovery Asia-Pacific